Armando Enrique Arce Salinas  (born 27 January 1997) is a Mexican footballer who plays as a forward.

References

1997 births
Living people
Mexican footballers
Association football forwards
Correcaminos UAT footballers
Club Universidad Nacional footballers
Ascenso MX players
Liga Premier de México players
Tercera División de México players
Footballers from Tamaulipas
People from Ciudad Victoria